Adela pantherellus is a moth of the family Adelidae. It is found in Spain.

References

Moths described in 1848
Adelidae
Moths of Europe